Helen Holly Roth-Franta (born March 30, 1916) was an American crime writer. She authored novels and short stories in the genres of spy fiction and detective fiction. She also published works under the pseudonyms P.J. Merrill and K.G. Ballard. She published twelve novels in her lifetime and many short stories, one of which was nominated for an Edgar Award.

In 1964, Roth disappeared off the coast of Morocco while sailing on a ketch with her husband and is presumed to have died.

Early life and education 
Roth was born Helen Marjorie Roth on March 30, 1916, in Chicago to Benjamin Roemer Roth and Frances Ethel Ballard Roth. Her parents were traveling at the time, and stopped in Chicago for her birth. Roth was raised in America and Europe, mostly between Brooklyn and London, due to her father's business. However, she regarded herself as a New Yorker. She attended public schools in America and a variety of schools in Europe. She graduated from James Madison High School in Brooklyn. She attended many schools before earning a Bachelor of Arts (B.A.). Her first husband died in a train accident.

Career 
Roth began her career working as a fashion model before shifting to writing, working as a writer and editor for newspapers and magazines. She contributed to publications such as Cosmopolitan, Seventeen, The American Journal of Surgery, and the New York Post.

Roth debuted as an author with two novels serialized in periodicals. Roth's debut novel, The Content Assignment (1954), was first serialized in condensed form under the title The Girl Who Vanished in the May 16 and May 23, 1953, issues of The Saturday Evening Post. Her third novel The Sleeper (1955) was first serialized in condensed form under the title Rendezvous with a Traitor in the June 25 and July 9, 1954, issues of Collier's. Roth began writing detective fiction in 1957 with a series of two novels following Detective Inspector Richard Medford: Shadow of a Lady (1957) and Too Many Doctors (1962). Too Many Doctors is set on a ship off the European coast and centers on a young woman who falls off the boat and loses her memory. In 1959, she published The Slender Thread under the pseudonym P.J. Merrill. Under the pseudonym K.G. Ballard, she published four detective novels including Trial by Desire (1960). Roth served as secretary of Mystery Writers of America in the 1950s.

Roth's short story, "Who Walks Behind" (EQMM, September 1965), was nominated for the 1966 Edgar Allan Poe Award for Best Short Story.

Reception 
Roth's fiction was reviewed in many publications during her lifetime, but her work is largely considered to be critically overlooked.

Her works were assessed many times in Kirkus Reviews, where her debut novel The Content Assignment was a "catchy lead off to a good lead on." Kirkus praised Roth's "suspense and susceptibility" in their review of The Slender Thread (1959). Kirkus also praised Roth's "smooth handling of more complicated than believable liens and loyalties" in Bar Sinister (1960). Roth's final story, "The Game's the Thing" (1966), was called "a psychological startler that bears a remarkable resemblance to Dr. Berne's interpretations."

In 2011, writing for The Independent, author Christopher Fowler wrote that "if the plots seem far-fetched, her ability to turn up the tension is unquestionable."

Disappearance 

In 1960, Roth married Josef Franta, a Czechoslovak man who traveled on a Swiss passport. Franta was born in Prague on June 28, 1928. In 1960, Franta purchased a 49-foot wooden ketch named the Visa for $8,500. It was built in 1912 in Norway and weighed 25 tons. Franta later put the Visa into Holly Roth's name. Roth spent $20,000 renovating it. According to her brother Frank Roth, Holly had been living in Paris and Majorca for several years but lived aboard the Visa with Franta during the last year before her disappearance. Frank Roth last saw Holly in 1960, just before she married Franta. According to Frank, Holly met Franta in Geneva, where Franta was with the International Labour Organization (ILO). In a letter to her brother dated March 30, 1964, Roth wrote that Franta was having difficulty entering the United States. In her letter, she claimed the Central Intelligence Agency (CIA) was blackballing Franta and keeping a lengthy file on him.

On October 8, 1964, Roth and Franta departed Gibraltar aboard the Visa with the Canary Islands as their destination. On October 10, 1964, the Visa ran into a storm at sea. On 11 October 1964, Roth disappeared. Franta claimed they were 20 miles north of Safi, Morocco at the time. It was 4AM and he was below deck making coffee while Roth was on deck standing watch. A force suddenly shook the boat, knocking Franta against the wall. Making his way above deck, he saw a 145-foot-long ship sailing away from the Visa. He called out for Roth, but received no answer. He believed he saw a body wearing a life jacket in the water and called out for Roth, but once again received no answer. Franta steered the Visa toward the area and threw out a buoy, but the line fouled the propeller. Franta then tied a line to himself and went in the water to search for Roth, who he believed to be unconscious. He was unsuccessful and returned to the Visa. He then tied a longer rope to himself and jumped back in but was again unsuccessful. Returning to the Visa, he fired flares and a gun to attract fishing boats he had seen earlier. He then used the radio, and made contact with Radio Safi. Around noon, a Spanish fishing trawler called the Santa Africana hove to, put two men aboard the Visa and took her in tow to Safi. Franta reported the incident to the Moroccan authorities in Safi. Several fishing craft and a Spanish coastal freighter joined their inquiry, searching the spot where Roth was presumed to have gone overboard. Her brother Frank Roth received a copy of Franta's statement along with a "Presumptive Report of the Death of an American Citizen" signed by Robert G. Adam, the American vice consul in Casablanca, and dated October 15, 1964. The report lists Roth's cause of death as "accidental, presumed lost at sea and drowned." The report listed her name as Helen Holly Roth-Franta.

On November 23, 1964, a source at the State Department said, "We have not closed the case," and, "Our consul general is still working on it." On November 25, 1964, the Associated Press (AP) reported that the Moroccan police had listed Roth's death as accidental and that an inquiry into her disappearance was officially closed. The authorities permitted Franta to leave Morocco at any time, but he stayed in Safi trying to sell the Visa. According to Franta, an underwriter estimated the damage to the Visa at $5,600. Roth's body has never been found. She was 48 years old at the time of her disappearance. Julian Muller of Harcourt, Brace & World, Inc., publishers, a friend of Roth who had her power of attorney, described Roth as "tall, attractive, a rare person, kindly, imaginative and much beloved by everybody she knew. She had a great love of literature and letters and her speech and writing reflected it. She was a person of broad interests and highly articulate."

Adaptations 
Roth's short novel, The Girl Who Saw Too Much (August 1956, The American), was adapted for television by Robert J. Shaw and broadcast on the August 29, 1956 episode of Kraft Television Theatre, starring Betsy Palmer.

A story by Roth was adapted by Jerry Sohl as an episode of General Electric Theater. The episode, titled "So Deadly, So Evil", was broadcast on March 13, 1960. The cast included Ronald Reagan and Peggy Lee.

The Sleeper was adapted by Charles Sinclair as an episode of 77 Sunset Strip. The episode, titled "Genesis of Treason", was broadcast on April 29, 1960.

Her work also appeared on Moment of Fear.

At the time of her death, two of Roth's works had been purchased to be adapted into film, but neither were produced.

Selected works

Novels

as Holly Roth 
 
 
 
 
 
 
 
 
 
 
 

Medford series
 . Also serialised as Shadow of the Lady

as K.G. Ballard

as P.J. Merrill

Short fiction

See also 
List of people who disappeared mysteriously at sea

References

External links 
New York Times report on cia.gov

1916 births
1960s missing person cases
1964 deaths
20th-century American novelists
20th-century American short story writers
20th-century American women writers
American expatriates in England
American expatriates in France
American expatriates in Spain
American expatriates in Switzerland
American detective fiction writers
American mystery writers
American spy fiction writers
American women novelists
American women short story writers
James Madison High School (Brooklyn) alumni
Missing person cases in Morocco
Novelists from New York (state)
People declared dead in absentia
People lost at sea
Writers from Brooklyn
Writers from Chicago